In mathematics, quadratic variation is used in the analysis of stochastic processes such as Brownian motion and other martingales. Quadratic variation is just one kind of variation of a process.

Definition 

Suppose that  is a real-valued stochastic process defined on a probability space  and with time index  ranging over the non-negative real numbers.

where  ranges over partitions of the interval  and the norm of the partition  is the mesh. This limit, if it exists, is defined using convergence in probability.  Note that a process may be of finite quadratic variation in the sense of the definition given here and its paths be nonetheless almost surely of infinite 1-variation for every  in the classical sense of taking the supremum of the sum over all partitions; this is in particular the case for Brownian motion.

The covariation may be written in terms of the quadratic variation by the polarization identity:

Finite variation processes 
A process  is said to have finite variation if it has bounded variation over every finite time interval (with probability 1). Such processes are very common including, in particular, all continuously differentiable functions. The quadratic variation exists for all continuous finite variation processes, and is zero.

This statement can be generalized to non-continuous processes. Then, the quadratic variation is given by

The proof that continuous finite variation processes have zero quadratic variation follows from the following inequality.

Itô processes 

This generalizes to Itô processes that, by definition, can be expressed in terms of Itô integrals

where  is a Brownian motion. Any such process has quadratic variation given by

Semimartingales 
Quadratic variations and covariations of all semimartingales can be shown to exist. They form an important part of the theory of stochastic calculus, appearing in Itô's lemma, which is the generalization of the chain rule to the Itô integral. The quadratic covariation also appears in the integration by parts formula

which can be used to compute .

Alternatively this can be written as a stochastic differential equation:

where

Martingales 

All càdlàg martingales, and local martingales have well defined quadratic variation, which follows from the fact that such processes are examples of semimartingales.
It can be shown that the quadratic variation  of a general locally square integrable martingale  is the unique right-continuous and increasing process starting at zero, with jumps  and such that  is a local martingale.

A useful result for square integrable martingales is the Itô isometry, which can be used to calculate the variance of Itô integrals,

Another important result is the Burkholder–Davis–Gundy inequality. This gives bounds for the maximum of a martingale in terms of the quadratic variation.

If  is a continuous local martingale, then the Burkholder–Davis–Gundy inequality holds for any .

An alternative process, the predictable quadratic variation is sometimes used for locally square integrable martingales. Its existence follows from the Doob–Meyer decomposition theorem and, for continuous local martingales, it is the same as the quadratic variation.

See also 

 Total variation
 Bounded variation

References 

Stochastic processes